Scopula achrosta is a moth of the family Geometridae. It was described by Prout in 1935. It is found in Kashmir.

References

Moths described in 1935
achrosta
Taxa named by Louis Beethoven Prout
Moths of Asia